The former Westminster Presbyterian Church (also known as The First Spiritualist Temple) is a historic church building at 77 S. 6th Street in Columbus, Ohio.

Built in 1857 in the Romanesque Revival style, it was originally home to Westminster Presbyterian Church.  Spiritualists acquired the property after Westminster Presbyterian merged with another church circa 1900.

The building was listed on the National Register of Historic Places in 2001.

This building is not related to the current Westminster Presbyterian Church, at 222 Schoolhouse Lane, on the West side of Columbus.

References

External links

 Official website
 Current Westminster Presbyterian Church

Churches on the National Register of Historic Places in Ohio
National Register of Historic Places in Columbus, Ohio
Romanesque Revival church buildings in Ohio
Churches completed in 1857
Churches in Columbus, Ohio
Buildings in downtown Columbus, Ohio
Former Presbyterian churches in the United States
Spiritualism in the United States
1857 establishments in Ohio